Acrylonitrile butadiene styrene (ABS) (chemical formula (C8H8)x·(C4H6)y·(C3H3N)z ) is a common thermoplastic polymer. ABS is amorphous and therefore has no true melting point.

ABS is a terpolymer made by polymerizing styrene and acrylonitrile in the presence of polybutadiene. The proportions can vary from 15% to 35% acrylonitrile, 5% to 30% butadiene and 40% to 60% styrene. The result is a long chain of polybutadiene crisscrossed with shorter chains of poly(styrene-co-acrylonitrile). The nitrile groups from neighboring chains, being polar, attract each other and bind the chains together, making ABS stronger than pure polystyrene. The acrylonitrile also contributes chemical resistance, fatigue resistance, hardness, and rigidity, while increasing the heat deflection temperature. The styrene gives the plastic a shiny, impervious surface, as well as hardness, rigidity, and improved processing ease. The polybutadiene, a rubbery substance, provides toughness and ductility at low temperatures, at the cost of heat resistance and rigidity. The properties are created by rubber toughening, where fine particles of elastomer are distributed throughout the rigid matrix.

Properties
ABS provides favorable mechanical properties such as impact resistance, toughness, and rigidity when compared with other common polymers. A variety of modifications can be made to improve impact resistance, toughness, and heat resistance. The impact resistance can be amplified by increasing the proportions of polybutadiene in relation to styrene and also acrylonitrile, although this causes changes in other properties. Impact resistance does not fall off rapidly at lower temperatures. Stability under load is excellent with limited loads. Thus, by changing the proportions of its components, ABS can be prepared in different grades. Two major categories could be ABS for extrusion and ABS for injection molding, then high and medium impact resistance.

The final properties will be influenced to some extent by the conditions under which the material is processed to the final product. For example, molding at a high temperature improves the gloss and heat resistance of the product whereas the highest impact resistance and strength are obtained by molding at low temperature. Pigments can also be added, as the raw material's original color is translucent ivory to white. The aging characteristics of the polymers are largely influenced by the polybutadiene content, and it is normal to include antioxidants in the composition. Other factors include exposure to ultraviolet radiation, which additives are also available to protect against.

ABS polymers are resistant to aqueous acids, alkalis, concentrated hydrochloric and phosphoric acids and animal, vegetable and mineral oils, but they are swollen by glacial acetic acid, carbon tetrachloride and aromatic hydrocarbons and are attacked by concentrated sulfuric and nitric acids. They are soluble in esters, ketones (such as acetone), chloroform, and ethylene dichloride. They also offer poor resistance to chlorinated solvents, alcohols and aldehydes.

Even though ABS plastics are used largely for mechanical purposes, they also have electrical properties that are fairly constant over a wide range of frequencies. These properties are little affected by temperature and atmospheric humidity in the acceptable operating range of temperatures.

ABS is flammable when it is exposed to high temperatures, such as those of a wood fire. It will melt and then boil, at which point the vapors burst into intense, hot flames. Since pure ABS contains no halogens, its combustion does not typically produce any persistent organic pollutants, and the most toxic products of its combustion or pyrolysis are carbon monoxide and hydrogen cyanide. ABS is also damaged by sunlight. This caused one of the most widespread and expensive automobile recalls in US history due to the degradation of the seatbelt release buttons.

ABS can be recycled, although it is not accepted by all recycling facilities.

Mechanical properties
ABS is one of many types of thermoplastic with biomedical applications, with injection-molded components being easy to manufacture for single-use. It can be sterilized by gamma radiation or ethylene oxide (EtO).

Yellowing in ABS plastic occurs when it is exposed to UV light or excessive heat, which causes photo-oxidation of polymers that breaks polymer chains and causes the plastic to yellow and become brittle.

Transparent ABS
Most ABS is opaque because its components have different refractive indices.  Acrylonitrile and styrene make ABS stiff.  Butadiene particles are elastic and make ABS impact resistant.  Adding methyl methacrylate (MMA) helps to bring the refractive indices closer together, making it transparent, although the product has less impact resistance.

Production
ABS is derived from acrylonitrile, butadiene, and styrene. Acrylonitrile is a synthetic monomer produced from propylene and ammonia; butadiene is a petroleum hydrocarbon obtained from the C4 fraction of steam cracking; styrene monomer is made by dehydrogenation of ethylbenzene, a hydrocarbon obtained in the reaction of ethylene and benzene.

Machining
ABS is manufactured in a variety of grades, but for precision machining of ABS structural parts, it is recommended to use Machine Grade ABS. Machine Grade ABS is easily machined via standard machining techniques including; turning, drilling, milling, and sawing. ABS can be chemically affixed to itself and other like plastics.

Applications 

ABS was patented in 1948 and introduced to commercial markets by the Borg-Warner Corporation in 1954.

ABS's light weight and ability to be injection molded and extruded make it useful in manufacturing products such as drain-waste-vent (DWV) pipe systems. Musical instruments such as recorders, plastic oboes and clarinets, piano movements, and keyboard keycaps are commonly made out of ABS.

Other uses include golf club heads (because of its good shock absorbance), automotive trim components, automotive bumper bars, binoculars, inhalers, monoculars, nebulizers, non-absorbable sutures, tendon prostheses, drug-delivery systems tracheal tubes, enclosures for electrical and electronic assemblies (such as computer cases), protective headgear, whitewater canoes, buffer edging for furniture and joinery panels, luggage and protective carrying cases, pen housings, and small kitchen appliances. Toys, including LEGO (Lego bricks have been made from ABS since 1958) and Kre-O bricks, are a common application.

Household and consumer goods comprise the major applications of ABS.

ABS plastic ground down to an average diameter of less than 1 micrometer is used as the colorant in some tattoo inks.

3D printing 
When extruded into a filament, ABS plastic is a common material used in 3D printers, as it is cheap, strong, has high stability and can be post-processed in various ways (sanding, painting, gluing, filling and chemical smoothing). When being used in a 3D printer, ABS is known to warp due to  shrinkage that occurs while cooling during the printing process. The shrinking can be reduced by printing inside an enclosure on a heated print surface, using an adhesive such as a glue stick or hairspray to ensure the first layer of the print is well stuck to the print surface, or printing with a brim/raft at the base of the print to help increase adhesion to the print surface. ABS is only used in FFF/FDM 3D printers, as resin 3D printers can not melt plastic.

Particular forms of ABS filaments are ABS-ESD (electrostatic discharge) and ABS-FR (fire resistant), which are used in particular for the production of electrostatically sensitive components and refractory prefabricated parts.

Hazard for humans
ABS is stable to decomposition under normal use and polymer processing conditions with exposure to carcinogens well below workplace exposure limits. However, at higher temperatures at or above 400 °C (750 °F) ABS can decompose into its constituents: butadiene (carcinogenic to humans),  acrylonitrile (possibly carcinogenic to humans), and styrene (reasonably anticipated to be a human carcinogen).

Ultrafine particles (UFPs) may be produced at lower temperatures (such as in 3D Printing). Concerns have been raised regarding airborne UFP concentrations generated while 3D printing with ABS, as UFPs have been linked with adverse health effects, some of which may result from tissue obstruction in the kidneys, lungs, and intestines caused by a buildup of UFPs.

See also
 Novodur
 Polylactic acid (PLA)—also used for 3D Printing
 Retr0bright, a process for reversing the yellowing of white ABS plastic casings

References

External links

 Comparisons of many physical properties with other plastics
 Comparison between ABS and PLA for 3D Printing

Copolymers
Plastics
Thermoplastics
Engineering plastic